A skip link is an internal link at the beginning of a hypertext document that permits users to skip navigational material and quickly access the document's main content. Skip links are particularly useful for users who access a document with screen readers and users who rely on keyboards. Web pages and other hypertext documents often have a large amount of information that precedes the main content; while sighted mouse-users can "skip" past it to the desired content, other users may find they have to repeatedly move to the next link until they reach the page's main content. A skip link which bypasses this content can make the document much more accessible.

References

Web accessibility